Piranesi is an interactive paint system that enables the user to create artistic images from 3D scenes created using conventional modeling applications.

Image format
Piranesi uses the proprietary EPix file format. For every pixel, additional information is stored, such as distance from the viewer and material settings. EPix files can be rendered from 3D scenes using a fixed viewpoint by Piranesi's companion software, Vedute.

See also
 Matte painting

External links
 Beyond Photorealism - White paper describing the idea behind the software written by one of the software's original authors.

Film and video technology
Graphics software